Pavel Skrbek (born August 9, 1978) is a Czech former ice hockey defenceman. He played briefly in the National Hockey League (NHL) with the Pittsburgh Penguins and Nashville Predators between 1998 and 2001, though most of his career, which lasted from 1995 to 2018, was spent in the Swedish Hockey League and Czech Extraliga.

Playing career
Skrbek played one year in his native Czech Republic before being drafted by the Pittsburgh Penguins in the 2nd round, 28th overall in the 1996 NHL Entry Draft. After being drafted Skrbek returned to the Czech Republic and played 2 more years there.

For the 1998–1999 season Skrbek came to North America. He joined the Syracuse Crunch of the AHL and played 64 games with the team, scoring 22 points. That year he also made his NHL debut, appearing in 4 games with the Penguins. He spent the 1999–2000 season in the minors, playing the majority of the year with the Wilkes-Barre/Scranton Penguins before being traded to the Nashville Predators and playing briefly with the Milwaukee Admirals. Skrbek then spent the majority of the 2000–2001 season with the Admirals while also appearing in 5 games with the Predators.

For the 2001–2002 season Skrbek cracked the Predators starting lineup, but after 3 games he endured a concussion that sidelined him for the majority of the year. After recovering from the injury Skrbek chose to go back to the Czech Republic rather than the Predators. Since the 2002–2003 season Skrbek has played for a number of teams in the SEL.

Career statistics

Regular season and playoffs

International

Awards
 1998: Named Best Defenseman at World Junior Championship
 1998: World Junior Championship Second All-Star team

External links

1978 births
Living people
Czech ice hockey defencemen
Frölunda HC players
HC Olomouc players
Luleå HF players
Milwaukee Admirals players
Mora IK players
Nashville Predators players
Orli Znojmo players
Pittsburgh Penguins draft picks
Pittsburgh Penguins players
Skellefteå AIK players
Syracuse Crunch players
Wilkes-Barre/Scranton Penguins players
Sportspeople from Kladno
Czech expatriate ice hockey players in the United States
Czech expatriate ice hockey players in Sweden
Czech expatriate ice hockey players in Finland